The 2016 New Mexico State Aggies football team represented New Mexico State University in the 2016 NCAA Division I FBS football season. The Aggies played their home games at Aggie Memorial Stadium in Las Cruces, New Mexico and competed in the Sun Belt Conference. They were led by fourth–year head coach Doug Martin. Tyler Rogers was the team's quarterback.

Preseason
In 2015, New Mexico State compiled a 3–9 record (3–5 in conference play) during the regular season, failing to qualify for a bowl game for the fifty-fifth consecutive season.

New Mexico State had a coaching shake up prior to the season, when Martin hired defensive coordinator Frank Spaziani, whom Martin served as offensive coordinator for at Boston College in 2012. Spaziani replaced Zane Vance who served as defensive coordinator and linebackers coach in 2015. Vance was retained and promoted to Assistant Head Coach, Defensive Ends coach and Special Teams Coordinator.

Recruiting

Position key

Recruits
New Mexico State's recruiting class consisted of 23 recruits. New Mexico State's recruiting class was ranked 114th by Scout, 129th by 247Sports.com, not rated by Rivals and not rated by ESPN.

Schedule
New Mexico State Aggies announced its 2016 football schedule on March 3, 2016. The 2016 schedule consists of 5 home and 7 away games in the regular season. The Aggies will host Sun Belt foes Appalachian State, Georgia Southern, Louisiana–Lafayette, and Texas State, and will travel to Arkansas State, Idaho, South Alabama, and Troy. New Mexico State will skip out on two Sun Belt teams this season, Georgia State and Louisiana–Monroe.

The team will play four non–conference games, one home game against New Mexico from the Mountain West Conference, and will travel to three road games against UTEP from Conference USA (C–USA), and Kentucky and Texas A&M both from the Southeastern Conference (SEC).

Schedule Source:

Game summaries

at UTEP

New Mexico

at Kentucky

at Troy

Louisiana–Lafayette

at Idaho

Georgia Southern

at Texas A&M

at Arkansas State

Texas State

Appalachian State

at South Alabama

Roster

References

New Mexico State
New Mexico State Aggies football seasons
New Mexico State Aggies football